Crater is an upcoming American coming-of-age science fiction adventure film directed by Kyle Patrick Alvarez from a screenplay by John Griffin. The film is set to be released via streaming on Disney+.

Plot
After his father's death, a boy raised on a lunar mining colony goes on a journey exploring a mysterious crater with his four best friends, before he is permanently relocated to another planet.

Cast
 Isaiah Russell-Bailey as Caleb O'Conell, the protagonist
 Kid Cudi as Mr. O’Conell, Caleb's father
 Mckenna Grace
 Billy Barratt
 Orson Hong
 Thomas Boyce

Production
The spec script by John Griffin was initially featured on the 2015 Black List, an annual list of the best unproduced screenplays of the year, where it received 34 votes. On November 8, 2017, it was announced that 20th Century Fox had purchased the script from a pitch by visual effects supervisor Rpin Suwannath. However, as a result of the acquisition of 21st Century Fox by Disney, development on the project was halted. Shawn Levy was initially in negotiations to direct the film, before being replaced by Kyle Patrick Alvarez on January 12, 2021. Levy was now attached to produce the project instead alongside his 21 Laps Entertainment production partner Dan Levine. Due to the acquisition of Fox, the film was shifted to Disney's streaming service Disney+ for an exclusive streaming premiere instead of the traditional theatrical release. The film had an estimated budget of $53.4 million.

In March 2021, Mckenna Grace was cast in the film alongside Isaiah Russell-Bailey, Billy Barratt, Orson Hong, and Thomas Boyce. Scott Mescudi was cast in May.

Principal photography began on June 21, 2021 at Celtic Studios in Baton Rouge, Louisiana. Filming also took place in Los Angeles and lasted until August 20, 2021.

References

External links
 

21 Laps Entertainment films
American coming-of-age films
American science fiction adventure films
Disney+ original films
Films directed by Kyle Patrick Alvarez
Films set in outer space
Films shot in Los Angeles
Films shot in Louisiana
Upcoming English-language films
Upcoming films
Walt Disney Pictures films